C. T. Kurien (born c. 1932) is a professor of economics, now retired and resident in Bangalore, who has written many books on economics. Although left of center, he is far from being a Marxist.

C. T. Kurien attended Madras Christian College, graduating in 1953 with a master's degree in economics.
He went on to Stanford University, where he was awarded a PhD in 1962.
Returning to Madras Christian College, between 1962 and 1978 he was professor and head of the Department of Economics.
Kurien was a National Fellow of the University Grants Commission from 1975 to 77.
In 1978 he was appointed director of the Madras Institute of Development Studies, a national centre for social science research, holding this position for ten years.
He was a National Fellow of the Indian Council of Social Science Research from 1992 to 1994. 
He was chairman of the Madras Institute of Development Studies from 1997 to 2003, when he retired from academic work.

Kurien received the University Grants Commission's Lifetime Achievement Award in 1996.
He was appointed the first chairman of the Malcolm and Elizabeth Adiseshiah Trust in 1999.
He was president of the Indian Economic Association in 2002.
In 2003 he delivered the Dr Stanley Samartha Memorial lecture to the Bangalore Initiative for Religious Dialogue, speaking on the topic: "Communal harmony – A societal perspective".
As of 2012 he was a member of the board of the Institute for Social and Economic Change (ISEC) in Karnataka.
His most recent book "WEALTH AND ILLFARE — An Expedition into Real Life Economics" was published in 2012, when the author was 80.
It provides an accessible overview of economics, but questions the value of an economic system based on the pure pursuit of profit.

Bibliography
A selection of books published by C.T. Kurien

References

Living people
1930s births
20th-century Indian economists